Reiner Gies (born March 12, 1963, in Kaiserslautern, West Germany) is a former German boxer who won a Light Welterweight Bronze Medal at the 1988 Summer Olympics for West Germany. Four years earlier, when Los Angeles, California hosted the Games, he was eliminated in the quarterfinals.

Olympic results
Represented West Germany as a lightweight at the 1984 Los Angeles Olympic Games.
1st round bye
Defeated Samir Khenyab (Iraq) 4-1
Defeated John Kalbhenn (Canada) 5-0
Lost to Pernell Whitaker (United States) 0-5

Represented West Germany as a Light Welterweight at the 1988 Seoul Olympic Games, capturing a bronze medal.
Defeated Basil Maelagi (Solomon Islands) walkover
Defeated Lórant Szabó (Hungary) 5-0
Defeated Adrian Carew (Guyana) 3-2
Defeated Sodnomdarjaagiin Altansükh (Mongolia) 4-1
Lost to Vyacheslav Yanovskiy (Soviet Union) KO 1

Pro career
Gies turned pro in 1991 and had limited success, losing two fights to journeymen and retiring with a record of 13-2-0.

References

External links
 

1963 births
Living people
People from Kaiserslautern
Boxers at the 1984 Summer Olympics
Boxers at the 1988 Summer Olympics
Olympic boxers of West Germany
Olympic bronze medalists for West Germany
Olympic medalists in boxing
Medalists at the 1988 Summer Olympics
German male boxers
Sportspeople from Rhineland-Palatinate
Light-welterweight boxers